Phacopoidea is a superfamily of trilobites.

External links
trilobites.info - Gallery of Phacopida 
 - General information
 - More images

 
Arthropod superfamilies
Phacopina